Vellaisamy Thevar, known professionally as Madhurakavi Bhaskara Das, (Tamil:மதுரகவி பாஸ்கர தாஸ்) (1892–1952) was a popular Tamil film lyricist. In 1931 he wrote lyrics for H. M. Reddy's Kalidas movie. He was the first lyricist in the Tamil film industry.

Filmography
Das wrote the lyrics for the music in the following films.
 Kalidas - 1931
 Valli Thirumanam - 1933
 Bojarajan - 1935
 Chandragasan - 1936
 Raja Thesinggu - 1936
 Usa Kalyanam - 1936
 Dhevadas - 1937
 Sathi Agaliya - 1937
 Rajasegaran - 1937
 Kodaiyn Kadal - 1941
 Navena Thennairaman - 1941

References

Lyricists
1892 births
1952 deaths
Tamil people
Tamil-language lyricists